Events from the year 1981 in Scotland.

Incumbents 

 Secretary of State for Scotland and Keeper of the Great Seal – George Younger

Law officers 
 Lord Advocate – Lord Mackay of Clashfern
 Solicitor General for Scotland – Nicholas Fairbairn

Judiciary 
 Lord President of the Court of Session and Lord Justice General – Lord Emslie
 Lord Justice Clerk – Lord Wheatley
 Chairman of the Scottish Land Court – Lord Elliott

Events 
 1 February – Decriminalisation of homosexual activity between men over twenty-one years of age through the Criminal Justice (Scotland) Act 1980, Section 80, which enters into force on this day.
 5 March – the ZX81, a pioneering British home computer manufactured by Timex in Dundee, is launched by Sinclair Research, going on to sell over 1.5 million units worldwide.
 May
 Peugeot closes the Talbot car plant at Linwood, Renfrewshire, which was opened by the Rootes Group eighteen years earlier as Scotland's only car factory.
 Buchan Oil Field production begins in the North Sea.
 23 May – Scotland beat England 1-0 at Wembley.
 11 December – Closure of Bedlay Colliery, Glenboig.
 21 December – George Wood (Aberdeen) Ltd cease trawler operations.
 Undated
 Last manufacture of coal gas in the UK, at Millport, Isle of Cumbrae.
 Invergordon aluminium smelter closes.

Births 
 15 January – Sean Lamont, rugby player
 16 February – Alison Rowatt, field hockey midfielder
 19 February – Mark Boyle, snooker player
 28 February – Mark Brown, footballer
 25 March – Emily Smith, folk singer
 11 June – Alistair McGregor, field hockey goalkeeper
 14 June – Alastair Kellock, rugby union player
 11 August – Sandi Thom, pop singer-songwriter
 28 August – Kezia Dugdale, leader of the Scottish Labour Party
 7 September – Natalie McGarry, MP convicted of embezzlement
 16 September – David Mitchell, field hockey defender
 20 November – Scott Hutchison, indie rock singer-songwriter and visual artist (suicide 2018)
 Catriona Shearer, television news presenter

Deaths 
 6 January – A. J. Cronin, novelist (born 1896)
 23 February – Nan Shepherd, novelist and poet (born 1893)
 June – Wendy Wood, nationalist campaigner (born 1892 in England)
 22 August – Mairi Chisholm, nurse and ambulance driver in World War I, one of "The Madonnas of Pervyse" (born 1896)
 8 September – Bill Shankly, football manager (born 1913)
 19 October – Johnny Doyle, footballer (born 1951)

The arts
 30 March – release of historical drama film  Chariots of Fire that tells the story of devout Christian Eric Liddell competing in the 1924 Olympics.
 23 April – release of romantic comedy film Gregory's Girl.
 Alasdair Gray's first novel Lanark: A Life in Four Books is published in Edinburgh.
 Perrier Comedy Awards first presented to the best shows on the Edinburgh Festival Fringe.
 The Bluebells formed.
 First Fèis Bharraigh.

See also 
 1981 in Northern Ireland
 1981 in Wales

References 

 
Scotland
Years of the 20th century in Scotland
1980s in Scotland